Skookumchuck Narrows Provincial Park is a provincial park in the Sunshine Coast of British Columbia, Canada. It was established on August 25, 1957, to protect the Sechelt Rapids located in the Skookumchuck Narrows between Sechelt Inlet and Jervis Inlet.

References

External links

Provincial parks of British Columbia
Sunshine Coast (British Columbia)
Sunshine Coast Regional District
Chinook Jargon place names
Protected areas established in 1957
1957 establishments in British Columbia